Uttam is a solid-state gallium arsenide (GaAs) based active electronically scanned array (AESA) radar under development by the Electronics and Radar Development Establishment (LRDE), a laboratory of the Indian Defence Research and Development Organisation (DRDO). It is a low probability of intercept radar intended to be installed on the  HAL Tejas Mark 1A, HAL Tejas Mark 2 and HAL TEDBF aircraft with plans to implement a larger and more powerful variant on-board India's 5th Generation fighter aircraft, the HAL AMCA.

Description 
It is a liquid cooled AESA radar featuring quad band modules that can be stacked to form a larger unit. This allows the manufacturer to scale the radar to be used in larger aircraft. There are plan to create a larger scalable design to be used in India's fifth-generation HAL AMCA jet fighter.

The radar development began in 2012 and its full-scale model was displayed at the 2017 Aero India  air show and aviation exhibition. A fully functional AESA radar prototype was unveiled at Aero India 2019, the prototype was mounted inside the glass nose of a HAL Tejas prototype. As of 2021, three units were in various phases of testing,. The Uttam radar has completed 230 hours of airborne testing onboard two Tejas fighter jets (LSP2 and LSP3) and on an executive jet; presumed to be DRDO's Dornier 228 "Nabhratna" used as a flying test bed by LRDE. Once fully validated and certified, it is planned is to introduce the radar in later batches of Tejas Mark 1A aircraft. The Uttam radar will be used with DRDO's Unified Electronic Warfare suite.

During Aero India 2021, there was a licensing agreements for technology transfer from DRDO to Hindustan Aeronautics Limited for manufacturing and integration of the Uttam in the Mark 1A variant of the HAL Tejas.

Indian Air Force Test Pilot School will start final demonstration trial of Uttam AESA radar from December 2021 and if successful will be sent for serial production. As per Project director D Seshagiri of Electronics and Radar Development Establishment (LRDE), Uttam AESA radar is 95% indigenous, with only one imported subsystem. The radar has the capacity to track 50 targets at a range greater than 100 km while engaging 4 targets simultaneously. All 83 Tejas Mark 1A and AMCA will come equipped with this radar. Uttam AESA radar will also be installed into upgraded Sukhoi Su-30MKI and Mikoyan MiG-29K currently in use as front line platform of Indian Air Force and Indian Navy. Hindustan Aeronautics Limited is the lead integrator and Bharat Electronics is major supplier of subsystems. LRDE already completed 250 hours of performance testing on two Tejas fighters as well as Hawker 800 executive jet. National Flight Testing Centre had evaluated the radar and cleared it after performance tests. The integration problem of Astra BVRAAM due to older generation of radars will also be solved by Uttam.

Features

Full solid-state (electronics) radar, based on GaAs
High MTBCF (redundancy)
Extended detection ranges
Multi Target Tracking (50 Targets), Priority Tracking (4 Targets).
Simultaneous operation modes.
Solid-state, active phased array technology
Pulse Doppler, all aspect, shoot down capabilities
Simultaneous multi-target tracking and engaging 
Simultaneous multi-mode operation
High ECM immunity
Ultra-low side-lobe antenna
Flexible interfaces allowing scalable design.
Modular hardware and software
Fast-beam agile system
Quad band TRM modules pack
High mission reliability (built with redundancy)
IFF modes.
 C-band LOS, Ku band satcom link.

Operational Modes 

Uttam AESA radar has a total of 18 modes in Air to Air, Air to Ground and Air to Sea roles. The modes have been validated on-board a business jet and further proofing is being done on HAL Tejas to validate the same on supersonic platform.
 
 Air-to-Air
 TWS/Multi-target detection and tracking
 Multi-target ACM
 High resolution raid assessment
 Air-to-Ground
 High resolution imaging (SAR Mode)
 High resolution tracking (SAR Mode)
 AGR – Air-to-Ground Ranging
 RBM – Real Beam Map
 DBS – Doppler Beam Sharpening
 GMTI on RBM, SAR
 Weather
 Air-to-Sea
 High resolution imaging (SAR Mode)
 High resolution tracking (SAR Mode)
 Sea search and multi-target tracking
 RS and ISAR classification modes.

Gallery

See also
 HAL Tejas
 HAL Tejas Mark 2
 HAL TEDBF
 HAL AMCA
 DRDO AEW&CS
 Phased array
 Active electronically scanned array

References

Aircraft radars
Military radars of India
Defence Research and Development Organisation